Ecem Cumert (born 7 February 1998) is a German-born Turkish footballer, who plays as a midfielder for Turkish Women's Super League club Fenerbahçe and the Turkey national team.

Early life 
Cumert was born in Ehingen, Baden-Württemberg, Germany on 7 February 1998. She has dual citizenship of Germany and Turkey. She lived till the age of 14 in Munderkingen with her brother Mert, her sisters Gülafer-Ceren and Cemre, and her parents. She then moved to Freiburg to start her football career.

Club career 
Cumert played in Germany for SC Freiburg in the German Frauen-Bundesliga. Between 2014 and 2017, she capped 22 times and scored four goals in total. At the end of the 2016–17 Frauen-Regionalliga season, her team became champion of the Group South and was promoted to the 2. Frauen-Bundesliga.

In September 2017, she moved to Turkey and transferred to the Istanbul-based Ataşehir Belediyespor to play in the Turkish Women's First Football League.

After scoring two goals in 17 matches of the 2017-18 season, she returned to  Germany to play for her hometown club SV Alberweiler in the Frauen-Regionalliga Süd. She capped in 16 games and scored  ten goals for SV Alberweiler in two seasons. Cumert transferred to MSV Duisburg for the 2020–21 Frauen-Bundesliga season.

In Summer 2021, she went to Turkey again, and joined Gaziantep-based ALG Spor to play in the 2021–22 Women's Super League.

In the 2022-23 Turkish Women's Super League season, she transferred to Fenerbahçe S.K..

International career 

Cumert played for the German national U-17 team before she switched over to the Turkey national team. She played on the Turkey national U-19 team in three matches of the at the 2017 UEFA Under-19 European Championship qualification – Group 10.

She was admitted to the Turkey national team and debuted internationally in the 2019 FIFA World Cup qualification – UEFA preliminary round – Group 4 match against Montenegro. She played in four of the UEFA European Championship 2021 qualifying Group A matches. She enjoyed the 2021-22 Women's Super League champion title of her team.

International goals

Career statistics 
.

Honours 
 Frauen-Regionalliga South
 SC Freiburg II
 Winners (1): 2016–17.

 Turkish Women's Super League
 ALG Spor
 Winners (1): 2021-22
 Ataşehir Belediyespor
 Winners (1): 2017–18

References 

1998 births
Living people
People from Ehingen
Sportspeople from Tübingen (region)
Footballers from Baden-Württemberg
German people of Turkish descent
Citizens of Turkey through descent
German women's footballers
Turkish women's footballers
Women's association football midfielders
Frauen-Bundesliga players
Turkey women's international footballers
SC Freiburg (women) players
Ataşehir Belediyespor players
MSV Duisburg (women) players
ALG Spor players
Turkish Women's Football Super League players
Fenerbahçe S.K. women's football players
Association football midfielders